Magic is a British music television channel owned by Channel Four Television Corporation. It plays mainly easy listening music videos and is based on the Magic radio station owned by Bauer Media Audio UK. Magic mainly focuses on music from the 1970s to the present day.

Like other Box Television music television channels under Bauer's brand, Magic operated a jukebox service where viewers were able to request videos to be played via a premium-rate telephone number.

Channel 4 has stated it will rebrand Magic TV in 2023, as the rights to use the Magic brand on the channel from Bauer will be ending.

History
The channel was a part of a network of channels owned by The Box Plus Network (formerly Box Television) which included 4Music, Kerrang! TV, Box Hits, The Box, and Kiss. All of these channels including Magic TV are now in Channel 4's main business operations.

On 2 April 2013, all Box Television channels went free-to-air on satellite, apart from 4Music which went free-to-view. As a result, the channels were removed from the Sky EPG in Ireland. However, Magic was launched on Freesat on 29 April 2013, alongside Heat, following the addition of four other Box Television channels on 15 April. Magic TV and its sister channels returned to Freesat on 8 December 2021.

From 27 September 2021 to 20 October 2021, Magic broadcast a simulcast of The Box, after the activation of a fire suppressant system at the premises of Red Bee Media on 25 September 2021. Magic TV was restored on 21 October 2021.

On 22 August 2022, Magic TV's on-screen Graphics were updated, removing the 'TV' wording from the logo, and making the programme titles bolder and slightly larger.

Programming
 Madonna Week
 Summer Feeling 
 Dancing Queen
 Late Night Magic
 Brighten Up Your Breakfast
 The Magic Singles of the Week – Sarah Powell plays 20 songs selected by Magic HQ.
 Rewind the Classics
 Feel the Magic
 Back to the...'s
 Simply... – Videos from a single artist.
 Magic 80s Weekend
Magic at the Movies – A block of countdowns and playlists featuring songs from film soundtracks, usually the block is in the form of a 'Magic at the Movies' Bank Holiday weekend, but some shows are part of the regular line-up
  Club Classics
  Magic Picks of the Week
  Louise's Girls Gone Solo
  Let's Talk About Duets 90s/00s/Pop Bands
  Christmas Countdowns Top 20/50

Compilation albums
The channel has released several compilation albums.

References

External links

Channel 4 television channels
Music video networks in the United Kingdom
Television channels and stations established in 2001
2001 establishments in the United Kingdom